Breshad Perriman (born September 10, 1993) is an American football wide receiver who is a free agent. He played college football at UCF and was drafted by the Baltimore Ravens in the first round of the 2015 NFL Draft. He has also been a member of the Washington Redskins, Cleveland Browns, New York Jets and Chicago Bears.

Early years
Perriman attended Arabia Mountain High School in Lithonia, Georgia, where he played high school football for the Rams. As a junior, he had 27 catches for 512 yards and six touchdowns. As a senior, he had 13 catches for 301 yards and three touchdowns in only four games played. Arguably the top receiver in DeKalb County during his senior season, Perriman participated in the 2010 DeKalb County Coaches Association Senior All-Star Football Game and was the MVP of the Elite One Performance Football Camp. Perriman finished his high school career for new Class 5A Arabia Mountain in Lithonia, after playing for Lithonia's Martin Luther King and Conyers' Heritage high schools.

Perriman was also a heralded youth track & field participant, routinely competing in USA Track and Field and Junior Olympic events across the country while growing up.

Perriman was rated by Rivals.com as a two-star recruit. He committed to the University of Central Florida (UCF) to play college football.

College career
Perriman attended UCF from 2012 to 2014. In UCF's final conference game of 2014, against East Carolina, Perriman had a game winning 51-yard touchdown reception. which gave the Knights a share of the American Athletic Conference Championship.

After his junior season, Perriman decided to forgo his senior season and entered the 2015 NFL Draft. He finished his collegiate career with 115 receptions for 2,243 yards and 16 touchdowns.

Collegiate statistics

Professional career

2015 NFL Draft
Perriman did not participate at the NFL Combine due to a hamstring injury. He did, however, show impressive physical ability at UCFs Pro Day at the end of March 2015, where he ran two sub-4.4 40-yard dashes. This sent him climbing in several mock drafts, and some projected him to be a mid-first round pick of the 2015 NFL Draft.

On April 30, 2015, Perriman was selected in the first round with the 26th overall pick by the Baltimore Ravens.

Baltimore Ravens
On May 11, 2015, Perriman signed a rookie contract with the Baltimore Ravens. The deal was reportedly worth $8.7 million over four years with a $4.6 million signing bonus. On November 17, 2015, Perriman was placed on season ending injured reserve. In his NFL debut on September 11, 2016, Perriman had one reception for 35 yards against the Buffalo Bills. Perriman's first start in the NFL came in October 23, 2016. He caught one pass for 11 yards in a 16–24 loss to the New York Jets.

On May 1, 2017, the Ravens announced that Perriman would switch from No. 18 to No. 11 for the season. Perriman wore No. 11 at UCF and was able to switch after the previous owner and fellow former UCF receiver, Kamar Aiken, left to the Indianapolis Colts during free agency.

On May 2, 2018, the Ravens declined the fifth-year option on Perriman's contract, making him a free agent in 2019.

On September 1, 2018, Perriman was released by the Ravens.

Washington Redskins
On September 17, 2018, Perriman signed with the Washington Redskins, but was waived five days later on September 22.

Cleveland Browns
On October 13, 2018, Perriman signed with the Cleveland Browns. He finished the season with 16 catches for 340 yards and two touchdowns.

Tampa Bay Buccaneers
On March 13, 2019, Perriman signed a one-year $4 million contract with the Tampa Bay Buccaneers. In Week 13, during a 28–11 win over the Jacksonville Jaguars, Perriman had a career-best five catches for 87 yards. In Week 14, during a 38–35 win over the Indianapolis Colts, Perriman caught three passes for 70 yards and a game clinching touchdown. In Week 15, during a 38–17 win over the Detroit Lions, Perriman caught five passes for a career high 113 yards and three touchdowns.
In the following week's game against the Houston Texans, Perriman caught seven passes for 102 yards during the 23–20 loss. In Week 17 against the Atlanta Falcons, Perriman caught five passes for 134 yards and a touchdown during the 28–22 overtime loss. Overall, Perriman finished the 2019 season with 36 receptions for 645 receiving yards and six receiving touchdowns.

New York Jets
On April 1, 2020, Perriman signed a one-year contract with the New York Jets worth $8 million with $6 million guaranteed. In Week 9, on Monday Night Football against the New England Patriots, he had five receptions for 101 receiving yards and two receiving touchdowns in the 30–27 loss. In the 2020 season, Perriman appeared in and started 12 games. He finished with 30 receptions for 505 receiving yards and three receiving touchdowns.

Detroit Lions
On March 22, 2021, Perriman signed a one-year contract with the Detroit Lions. On August 30, 2021, the Lions cut Perriman.

Chicago Bears
On September 6, 2021, Perriman signed a one-year deal, $900,000 contract with the Chicago Bears. He was waived on November 7, 2021, without playing a snap for the team.

Tampa Bay Buccaneers (second stint) 
On November 9, 2021, Perriman was signed to the Tampa Bay Buccaneers practice squad. He was promoted to the active roster in December. On December 12, 2021, Perriman caught a 58-yard touchdown from Tom Brady. The touchdown was a walk—off in overtime against the Bills. The pass was Brady’s 700th touchdown pass. Perriman played in six games in the 2021 season and had 11 receptions for 167 yards and one touchdown.

On March 24, 2022, Perriman re-signed with the Buccaneers.
Perriman appeared in 11 games in the 2022 season. He finished with nine receptions for 110 receiving yards and one receiving touchdown.

NFL career statistics

Personal life
His father, Brett Perriman, played ten years in the NFL as a wide receiver for four teams.

References

External links

Tampa Bay Buccaneers bio
UCF Knights bio

1993 births
Living people
People from Lithonia, Georgia
Players of American football from Georgia (U.S. state)
Sportspeople from DeKalb County, Georgia
American football wide receivers
UCF Knights football players
Baltimore Ravens players
Washington Redskins players
Cleveland Browns players
Tampa Bay Buccaneers players
New York Jets players
Detroit Lions players
Chicago Bears players